Duo is an acoustic album by Richard Marx and Vertical Horizon vocalist Matt Scannell.  The disc was released on May 12, 2008, exclusively through RichardMarx.com, and was later made available for sale at their concerts together as well. Marx and Scannell exhibit both of their acclaimed works. Marx remade a version of "Always On Your Mind," for his 2008 album Sundown. The disc is predominantly done on acoustic guitar aside from the track "Give You Back" performed on piano.

Track listing
 "Always On Your Mind" (Marx/Scannell) - 3:57
new song
 "Sunshine" (Scannell) - 3:40
from the Vertical Horizon album Go
 "Endless Summer Nights" (Marx) - 4:29
from the Richard Marx album Richard Marx
 "We Are" (Scannell) - 4:25
from the Vertical Horizon album Everything You Want
 "Hazard" (Marx) - 4:35
from the Richard Marx album Rush Street
 "Give You Back" (Scannell) - 4:25
from the Vertical Horizon album Everything You Want
 "Love Goes On" (Marx) - 3:46
from the Richard Marx album My Own Best Enemy
 "Echo" (Scannell) - 4:26
from the Vertical Horizon album Go
 "Your World" (Marx) - 5:07
from the Richard Marx album Rush Street
 "Everything You Want" (Scannell) - 4:31
from the Vertical Horizon album Everything You Want

Personnel
Richard Marx – lead and background vocals, acoustic guitar, piano, producer, arranger
Matt Scannell – lead and background vocals, acoustic guitar, producer, arranger
Joel Numa – engineer
Mat Prock – engineer

References

2008 albums
Albums produced by Richard Marx
Richard Marx albums
Collaborative albums
Self-released albums